The Revolutionary Command Council for National Salvation (RCCNS-Sudan) was the governing body of Sudan following the June 1989 coup. It grew out of the collaboration between the Sudanese military and the National Islamic Front. It was the authority by which the military government of Sudan under Lt. Gen. Omar al-Bashir exercised power.

Al-Bashir was the Chair of the Council, as well as Prime Minister, Defense Minister and Commander-in-Chief of the Sudanese Armed Forces. The rest of the council consisted of fourteen military officers, all of whom were involved in and associated with the coup. Therefore, no regulations about the selection and tenure of its members were declared to the public.

The RCCNS exercised legislative as well as some executive authority.  It appointed committees to draft various legal decrees. The RCCNS did not publish any rules of procedures over its deliberations.

It banned political activity, arrested opposition members and closed down newspapers.

The RCCNS survived a coup attempt in 1990.

The RCCNS dissolved itself in October 1993, and its powers devolved to the President and the National Legislature of Sudan. This resulted in a majority of the power remaining with President al-Bashir.

References

Sources

Government of Sudan
1989 establishments in Sudan
History of Sudan
Historical legislatures
Organizations disestablished in 1993
1993 disestablishments in Sudan
Military dictatorships